William Spigurnell (also Spygurnell) (fl. 1390s - 1420s) was a Canon of Windsor from 1395 to 1425 and Archdeacon of Colchester.

Career
He was appointed:
Prebendary of Erdington in the King's free chapel of Bridgnorth 1391.
Archdeacon of Colchester 1411 - 1425

He was appointed to the fifth stall in St George's Chapel, Windsor Castle in 1394 and held the canonry until 1425.

Notes 

1425 deaths
Canons of Windsor
Archdeacons of Colchester
Year of birth unknown